Anthony Raymond Hogg (11 December 1929 – 2013) was an English professional footballer who played in the Football League for Aston Villa, Mansfield Town and Peterborough United.

References

1929 births
2013 deaths
English footballers
Association football defenders
English Football League players
Berwick Rangers F.C. players
Mansfield Town F.C. players
Aston Villa F.C. players
Peterborough United F.C. players